The Fuji LM-1 Nikko is a Japanese light communications aircraft of the 1950s.

Development

Fuji Heavy Industries built 176 Beech T-34 Mentor two-seat training aircraft under licence in the early 1950s. Fuji then redesigned the basic Mentor as a four-seat communications aircraft under the designation LM-1.  A new lengthened centre fuselage was added to the Mentor's wing, undercarriage and tail assembly. 27 LM-1s were produced during 1955-1956.

Operational history

The LM-1s were delivered to the Japanese Air Self-Defense Force (JASDF) and were used for communications and general duties. After withdrawal from operation, several LM-1s were sold on the U.S. civil market and are flown by civil pilots as "warbirds".

Variants

LM-1 four-seat communications aircraft with 225 h.p. (168 kW) Continental engine (27 built)

LM-2 higher-powered version with 340 h.p. (254 kW) Lycoming engine (2 built)

RTAF-2 a variant developed in Thailand by Thai Aviation Industry.

LM-11 Supernikko A proposed more powerful version of the LM-1 powered by a  Lycoming GSO-480-B1A6 engine; became the LM-2.

Specifications (LM-1)

References

Notes

Bibliography

 

 

1950s Japanese military utility aircraft
LM-1
Low-wing aircraft
Single-engined tractor aircraft
Aircraft first flown in 1955